The Saegheh (English: "Thunderbolt") is an Iranian turbofan/piston-powered  flying wing unmanned combat aerial vehicle (UCAV) produced by Shahed Aviation Industries. It is based on, but smaller than and substantially different from, a Lockheed Martin RQ-170 Sentinel UAV that was captured by Iran in 2011 and then reverse-engineered. It is one of two Iranian flying wing UAVs based on the RQ-170, along with the Shahed 171 Simorgh, a larger version.

The Saegheh was revealed in October 2016.

A number of western sources have expressed doubt that the Saegheh is weapons-capable, and say it is solely an ISR platform.

As of 2017, 10 Saegheh drones were in production, and  Iran planned to procure at least 50 by 2025.

Variants 
The specifications for the Saegheh are unknown, but it is believed to have a wingspan around 6–7 meters.

Saegheh-1

The Saegheh-1 was first presented at an Iranian arms expo in 2016.

Iranian state news claimed the Saegheh-1 could carry four Sadid-1 precision-guided anti-tank guided missiles. The Iranian Government did not provide a demonstration of the UAV flying, or state what its range was. The Saegheh-1 had no apparent targeting/optical system.

The first models of Saegheh lacked the frontal air intake of the Simorgh/RQ-170.

Saegheh-2
This model is also known as the Shahed 191. Later shown models have frontal air intake. The probability is that only piston engined models do not have frontal intakes. The UAV takes off from specialized racks mounted on a vehicle speeding down a runway (probably Toyota Hilux trucks) and is recovered on a runway with retractable landing skids. According to Tasnim News, the Shahed 191 is 60% of the size of the RQ-170.

The Shahed 191 carries two Sadid-1 missiles internally and lands on retractable landing skids. The Shahed 191 has a cruising speed of 300 km/h, an endurance of 4.5 hours, a range of 450 km, and a payload of 50 kg. The ceiling is 25,000 ft. The wing span is 7.31 meters, the length 2.7 meters, the max takeoff weight 500 kg, and the max speed 350 km/h.

Fars News Agency says the Saegheh-2 has been used in combat in Syria, using missiles against the Islamic State terrorist organization.

Propeller-powered variant
In wargames held in 2019 Iran showed a Saegheh variant powered by a propeller. It carries its Sadid-1 weapons externally and lands on fixed landing skids. It takes off similarly to the Shahed 191 variant.

Operational history 

On 1 October 2018, the IRGC Aerospace Force used ballistic missiles and drones, supposedly including Saegheh UAVs, to attack targets in the Abu Kamal region, in Eastern Syria. Although Iran had first shown the Saegheh with four Sadid-1 missiles slung under the body, in this incident they released video they said showed a Saegheh UAV releasing  a single Sadid-1 bomb from its internal bomb bays.

Israel shot down a Saegheh during the February 2018 Israel–Syria incident. The Times of Israel reported that the UAV's design was largely based on the captured RQ-170; IAF Brigadier General Tomer Bar said that the drone was quite advanced and imitated western technology.

In July 2022, the United States claimed that Russian officials had travelled to Iran to 'examine' drones, including several labelled on satellite images as Shahed-191. At least one of these aircraft was pictured in flight near Kashan airfield. The report stated that the aircraft appeared to be 'attack-capable'.

Operators

 Islamic Revolutionary Guard Corps - Aerospace Force

Specifications (Shahed 191)

See also 

 Iran–U.S. RQ-170 incident

Related development 

 Lockheed Martin RQ-170 Sentinel
 Shahed 171 Simorgh

Aircraft of comparable role, configuration and era 
 AVIC 601-S
 Northrop Grumman RQ-180
 Mikoyan Skat
 Sukhoi Okhotnik
 Northrop Grumman Bat

References

 

 

Saegheh
Unmanned military aircraft of Iran
Iranian military aircraft
Aircraft manufactured in Iran
Islamic Republic of Iran Air Force
Post–Cold War military equipment of Iran
Unmanned aerial vehicles of Iran